Pierre-Jean Peltier (born 20 May 1984 in Pont-à-Mousson) is a French rower. He competed at the 2008 Summer Olympics, where he won a bronze medal in quadruple sculls.

References 
 Bio on results.beijing2008.cn

Living people
1984 births
French male rowers
Olympic bronze medalists for France
Olympic rowers of France
Rowers at the 2008 Summer Olympics
Rowers at the 2012 Summer Olympics
Olympic medalists in rowing
Medalists at the 2008 Summer Olympics
European Rowing Championships medalists
21st-century French people